WELU (channel 34), branded on-air as CTNi Puerto Rico, is a CTN-affiliated television station licensed to Toa Baja, Puerto Rico. The station is owned by Senda Educational Broadcasting. The station shares transmitter facilities with WSJN-CD (channel 20) at the Monte Renovados La Peña in Bayamon.

Digital television

Digital channels
The station's digital signal is multiplexed:

Analog-to-digital conversion

On June 12, 2009, WELU signed off analog broadcast and reverting to digital channel.

Spectrum reallocation 
On August 14, 2017, it was revealed that WELU's over-the-air spectrum had been sold in the FCC's spectrum reallocation auction, fetching $375,347. WELU will not sign off, but it will later share broadcast spectrum with WSJN-CD that also covers the entire metropolitan area. Also will change their city of license from Aguadilla to Toa Baja.

References

External links 

Toa Baja, Puerto Rico
ELU
Television channels and stations established in 1986
1986 establishments in Puerto Rico